James G. Pearce (born in Chirk in North Wales, died date and place unknown) was a Welsh footballer who played as a centre half. He made over 150 Football League appearances in the years before and after the Second World War.

Career
Jim Pearce played locally for Chirk and the Royal Tank Corps in the Army. Bob Hewison signed Pearce in August 1934 for Bristol City. Pearce joined Rochdale in May 1939. Jim Pearce represented the Army during wartime service in Greece and the Middle East. In 1946 Jim Pearce joined Cardiff City without making a return to first team football.

References

People from Chirk
Sportspeople from Wrexham County Borough
Welsh footballers
English Football League players
Rochdale A.F.C. players
Cardiff City F.C. players
Bristol City F.C. players
Association football defenders
Year of birth missing